Silk Road Numismatics is a special field within Silk Road studies and within numismatics. It is particularly important because it covers a part of the world where history is not always clear – either because the historical record is incomplete or is contested. For example, numismatics has played a central role in determining the chronology of the Kushan kings.

Silk Road Coins
Silk Road numismatics includes all coinage traditions from East Asia to Europe, from earliest times. There is a great deal of merging of coinage traditions at locations on the Silk Road, and expertise in several coinage traditions is required to understand these. A notable example is the Sino-Kharoshthi coinage of Khotan, in which two coinage traditions come together - these coins are bilingual, with a Kharoshthi inscription on one side and a Chinese inscription on the other. They relate to both the Attic standard of ancient Greek coinage and to the wuzhu system of the Han dynasty, and name the local kings of Khotan, for whom there is no indigenous historical record.

Training
As with all branches of numismatics, most training is object-based, and therefore tends to take place where there are specialist collections. The Hirayama Trainee Curatorship in Silk Road Numismatics was established in the early 1990s, as "a five-year project to enable young scholars at the beginning of their careers, to come to the British Museum for a full academic year to develop their knowledge of Silk Road coins." The five scholars were Chandrika Jayasinghe (Dept of Archaeology, Colombo, Sri Lanka), Naushaba Anjum (Lahore Museum, Pakistan), Sergei Kovalenko (Pushkin Museum, Moscow, Russia), Shah Nazar Khan (Peshawar University Museum, Pakistan), Wang Dan (China Numismatic Society, China). Other scholars have received grants from the Neil Kreitman Central Asian Numismatic Endowment, administered by the Royal Numismatic Society.

Silk Road Money
Coins were not the only form of money on the Silk Road, as recent studies on textiles have shown.

Exhibitions and displays
Long-term
Silk Road Coin Gallery, at the Shanghai Museum (with catalogue) 
Silk Road Coins at the British Museum - in the Joseph E. Hotung Gallery (Room 33) and the Citi Money Gallery (Room 68)

Short-term
 1992 The Crossroads of Asia : transformation in image and symbol in the art of ancient Afghanistan and Pakistan (Fitzwilliam Museum, 1992). (see catalogue)
 1993 Silk Road Coins: the Hirayama Collection. A special loan exhibition from Japan (British Museum, 1993). (see catalogue)
 1997 From Persepolis to the Punjab: Coins and the Exploration of the East (British Museum, 1997) (see publication)

Exhibition catalogues
 1992 The Crossroads of Asia : transformation in image and symbol in the art of ancient Afghanistan and Pakistan, by Joe Cribb and Elizabeth Errington, with Maggie Claringbull (Cambridge: Ancient India and Iran Trust, 1992).
 1993 Silk Road Coins: The Hirayama Collection by Katsumi Tanabe (Kamakura: Silk Road Institute, 1993).
 2006 Shanghai Museum's Collection of Ancient Coins from the Silk Road 《上海博物馆藏丝绸之路古代国家钱币》 (Shanghai: Shanghai Museum, 2006).

Further reading

Bracey, Robert (2012), "The Mint Cities of the Kushan Empire", in F. Lopez-Sanchez (ed.), The City and the Coin in the Ancient and Early Medieval Worlds,  BAR S2402; 2012, pp. 117–132.
Cribb, Joe (1984), "The Sino-Kharosthi Coins of Khotan: Their Attribution and Relevance to Kushan Chronology: Part 1", Numismatic Chronicle Vol. 144 (1984), pp. 128–152.
Cribb, Joe (1985), "The Sino-Kharosthi Coins of Khotan: Their Attribution and Relevance to Kushan Chronology: Part 2", Numismatic Chronicle Vol. 145 (1985), pp. 136–149.
Cribb, Joe, "Money as a Marker of Cultural Continuity and Change in Central Asia", in Joe Cribb and Georgina Herrmann (eds) After Alexander. Central Asia Before Islam (Proceedings of the British Academy 133, 2007), pp. 333–375.
Curtis, Vesta and Alexandra Magub, Rivalling Rome: Parthian Coins and Culture (Spink, 2020). ISBN 978-1912667444
Dong Qingxuan and Jiang Qixiang, and the Xinjiang Numismatics editorial board (1991), Xinjiang Numismatics (Xinjiang Art and Photo Press/ Educational and Cultural Press, Hong Kong, 1991) 
Errington, Elizabeth and Curtis, Vesta Sarkhosh (2007), From Persepolis to the Punjab: Exploring Ancient Iran, Afghanistan and Pakistan (London: British Museum Press, 2007)
Hansen, Valerie and Wang, Helen (eds) (2013), Textiles as Money on the Silk Road (special issue of Journal of the Royal Asiatic Society, 2013, vol. 23, no. 2.
Jongeward, David and Joe Cribb with Peter Donovan, Kushan, Kushano-Sasanian, and Kidarite Coins (New York: American Numismatic Society, 2015)
Lin Ying, "Solidi in China and Monetary Culture along the Silk Road", The Silk Road, vol. 3, no. 2.
Lin Ying (2003), "Western Turks and Byzantine gold coins found in China", Transoxiana 6, July 2003.
Rtveladze, Edvard, "Monetary Circulation in Ancient Tokharistan", in Joe Cribb and Georgina Herrmann (eds) After Alexander. Central Asia Before Islam (Proceedings of the British Academy 133, 2007), pp. 389–397.
Shanghai Museum (ed.), Proceedings of the Symposium on Ancient Coins and the Culture of the Silk Road (Shanghai shuhua chubanshe, 2011). 上海博物館編 《絲綢之路古國錢幣暨絲路文化國際學術研討會論文集》上海書畫出版社  (summary of contents in English)
Skaff, Jonathan Karam, "Sasanian and Arab-Sasanian Silver Coins from Turfan: Their Relationship to International Trade and the Local Economy", Asia Major 3rd series, Vol. 11, No. 2 (1998), pp. 67–115.
Smirnova, Natasha, "Some Questions Regarding the Numismatics of Pre-Islamic Merv", in Joe Cribb and Georgina Herrmann (eds) After Alexander. Central Asia Before Islam (Proceedings of the British Academy 133, 2007), pp. 377–388.
Tanabe, Katsumi; Cribb, Joe and Wang, Helen (eds) (1997), Studies in Silk Road Coins and Culture: Papers in honour of Professor Ikuo Hirayama on his 65th birthday (Kamakura: Institute of Silk Road Studies, 1997)
Thierry, François (2012), "Rome et la Chine, trois notes de numismatique", L’Archéothéma, No 19, mars-avril 2012, pp. 27–33.
Thierry, François (1993), "Sur les monnaies sassanides trouvées en Chine", Res Orientales, V, 1993, 89-139.
Wang, Helen (2004), Money on the Silk Road. The Evidence from Eastern Central Asia to c. AD 800 (London: British Museum Press, 2004)
Wang, Helen (2004), “How Much for a Camel? A New Understanding of Money on the Silk Road before AD 800", in Susan Whitfield, ed. The Silk Road: Trade, Travel, War and Faith. Chicago: Serindia, 2004, pp. 24–33.
Wang, Helen (2007), "Money in Eastern Central Asia before AD 800", in Joe Cribb and Georgina Herrmann (eds) After Alexander. Central Asia Before Islam (Proceedings of the British Academy 133, 2007), pp. 399–409.

Specialist journals

Articles on Silk Road Numismatics appear in a number of scholarly journals, including:
Silk Road Art and Archaeology (Journal of the Institute of Silk Road Studies, Kamakura, Japan)
Bulletin of the Asia Institute (UK)
Numismatic Chronicle (Royal Numismatic Society, UK)
Journal of the Oriental Numismatic Society (UK)
Revue numismatique (France)
Numismatique asiatique (La Société de Numismatique Asiatique, France)

References

 
Numismatics
Chinese numismatics